Robert Michels (9 January 1876 – 3 May 1936) was a German-born Italian sociologist who contributed to elite theory by describing the political behavior of intellectual elites. 

He belonged to the Italian school of elitism. He is best known for his book Political Parties, published in 1911, which contains a description of the "iron law of oligarchy." He was a friend and disciple of Max Weber, Werner Sombart and Achille Loria. 

Politically, he moved from the Social Democratic Party of Germany to the Italian Socialist Party, adhering to the Italian revolutionary syndicalist wing and later to Italian Fascism, which he saw as a more democratic form of socialism. His ideas provided the basis of moderation theory which delineates the processes through which radical political groups are incorporated into the existing political system.

Early life and education
Michels born to a wealthy German family, studied in England, Paris (at the Sorbonne), and at universities in Munich, Leipzig (1897), Halle (1898), and Turin. He became a socialist while teaching at the Protestant University of Marburg and became active in the Social Democratic Party of Germany for whom he was an unsuccessful candidate in the 1903 German federal election. In Italy, he associated with Italian revolutionary syndicalism, a leftist branch of the Italian Socialist Party (PSI). He left both parties in 1907.

Career
He achieved international recognition for his historical and sociological study, Zur Soziologie des Parteiwesens in der modernen Demokratie. Untersuchungen über die oligarchischen Tendenzen des Gruppenlebens, which was published in 1911; its title in English is Political Parties: A Sociological Study of the Oligarchical Tendencies of Modern Democracy. In it, he presented his theory of the "iron law of oligarchy" that political parties, including those considered socialist, cannot be democratic because they quickly transform themselves into bureaucratic oligarchies. 

Michels attended the First International Eugenics Congress in 1912 where he delivered a paper entitled "Eugenics in Party Organization".
Michels was considered a brilliant pupil of Max Weber, who began publishing his writings in the Archiv für Sozialwissenschaft und Sozialpolitik in 1906 and appointed him as co-editor in 1913, but they disagreed over Michels' opposition to World War I.

Michels criticized what he perceived to be Karl Marx's materialistic determinism. Michels borrowed from Werner Sombart's historical methods. Because Michels admired Italian culture and was prominent in the social sciences, he was brought to the attention of Luigi Einaudi and Achille Loria. They succeeded in procuring for Michels a professorship at the University of Turin, where he taught economics, political science and socioeconomics until 1914. He then became professor of economics at the University of Basel, Switzerland, a post he held until 1928.

In 1924, he joined the Fascist Party, led by Benito Mussolini, former director of the Italian Socialist Party's newspaper "Avanti!". Michels was convinced that the direct link between Benito Mussolini's charisma and the working class was in some way the best means to realize a real lower social class government without political bureaucratic mediation. In 1928, he became professor of economics and the history of doctrines at the University of Perugia and occasionally lectured in Rome where he died on May 3, 1936.

Writings

 Syndicalisme & socialisme en Allemagne (Unionism & Socialism in Germany) (1908)
 Proletariato e la borghesia nel movimento socialista italiano (The Proletariat and the Bourgeoisie in the Italian Socialist Movement) (1908; 1975)
 Zur Soziologie des Parteiwesens in der modernen Demokratie. Untersuchungen über die oligarchischen Tendenzen des Gruppenlebens (On the Sociology of the Oligarchical Tendencies of Modern Democracy) (1911, 1925; 1970). Translated, as Sociologia del partito politico nella democrazia moderna : studi sulle tendenze oligarchiche degli aggregati politici, from the German original by Dr. Alfredo Polledro, revised and expanded (1912). Translated, from the Italian, by Eden and Cedar Paul as Political Parties: A Sociological Study of the Oligarchical Tendencies of Modern Democracy (Hearst's International Library Co., 1915; Free Press, 1949; Dover Publications, 1959); republished with an introduction by Seymour Martin Lipset (Crowell-Collier, 1962; Transaction Publishers, 1999); online at archive.org; translated into French by S. Jankélévitch, Les partis politiques. Essai sur les tendances oligarchiques des démocraties, Brussels, Editions de l'Université de Bruxelles, 2009.
 Grenzen der Geschlechtsmoral (Boundaries of Sexual Ethics). Italian translation, Morale sessuale revised and expanded by Alfredo Polledro (Fratelli Bocca, 19-?). Translated as Sexual Ethics: A Study of Borderland Questions (Walter Scott, George Allen & Unwin, Charles Scribner's Sons, 1914); republished with a new introduction by Terry R. Kandal (Transaction Publishers, 2001-2)
 Probleme der Sozialphilosophie (Problems of Social Philosophy) (1914)
 Imperialismo italiano, studi politico-demografici (Italian Imperialism: Political and Demographic Studies) (1914)
 Amour et chasteté; essais sociologiques (Love and Chastity: Sociological Essays) (1914)
 Organizzazione del commercio estero (The Organization of Foreign Trade) (1925)
 Sozialismus und Faschismus in Italien (Socialism and Fascism in Italy) (1925)
 Storia critica del movimento socialista italiano : dagli inizi fino al 1911 (Critical history of the Italian socialist movement) (La Voce, 1926)
 Corso di sociologia politica (First lectures in political sociology) (1927). Translated, and introduced by Alfred de Grazia, as First lectures in political sociology (University of Minnesota Press, 1949; Arno Press, 1974)
 Sittlichkeit in Ziffern? Kritik der Moralstatistik (Morality in Numerics? Criticism of Morale Statistics) (1928)
 Patriotismus, Prolegomena zu seiner soziologischen Analyse (Patriotism, Prolegomena to his sociological analysis) (1929)
 Einfluss der faschistischen Arbeitsverfassung auf die Weltwirtschaft (Influence of the Fascist Arbeitsverfassung on the World Economy) (1929)
 Italien von heute. Politische und wirtschaftliche Kulturgeschichte von 1860 bis 1930 (Italy Today - Political and Economical Cultural History from 1860 to 1930) (1930)
 Introduzione alla storia delle dottrine economiche e politiche (Introduction to the history of economic and political doctrines) (1932)
 Boicottaggio, saggio su un aspetto delle crisi (Boycotts, an essay on an aspect of crises) (1934)
 Boycottage international (International boycotts) (1936)
 Verelendungstheorie. Studien und Untersuchungen zur internationalen Dogmengeschichte der Volkswirtschaft, with a foreword by Heinz Maus (Pauperization Theory - Studies and Research into International Dogmas History of National Economy) (1970)
 Elite e/o democrazia (Elites and/or democracy) (G. Volpe, 1972)
 Antologia di scritti sociologici (Anthology of publications on sociology); edited by Giordano Sivini (1980)
 Works on paper, 1918-1930 (Barbara Mathes Gallery, 1984)
 Critique du socialisme : contribution aux débats du début du XXè siècle (Critique of Socialism: contributions to the debates at the start of the 20th century); articles selected and presented by Pierre Cours-Salies and Jean-Marie Vincent (Editions Kimé, 1992)

References

 Volpe, Giorgio: Italian Elitism and the Reshaping of Democracy in the United States, Routledge, 2021 
 For a critique of Michels see Colin Barker ‘Robert Michels and the “Cruel Game”’ in Colin Barker et al eds. Leadership and Social Movements (Manchester: Manchester University Press, 2001)
 "Robert Michels And the "Iron Law of Oligarchy"," chapter 12 of Revolution and Counterrevolution: Change and Persistence in Social Structures by Seymour Martin Lipset
 Entwicklung zum faschistischen Führerstaat in der politischen Philosophie von Robert Michels by Frank Pfetsch (1965)
 Robert Michels; vom sozialistisch-syndikalistischen zum faschistischen Credo by Wilfried Röhrich (Duncker & Humblot, 1971).
 Organizzazione, partito, classe, politica e legge ferrea dell'oligarchia in Roberto Michels by Giorgio Sola (1972)
 Sociology and estrangement: three sociologists of Imperial Germany by Arthur Mitzman (Knopf, 1973). Republished with a new introduction by the author (Transaction Books, 1987).
 The anti-democratic sources of elite theory: Pareto, Mosca, Michels by Robert A. Nye (SAGE, 1977).
 Dilemmi della democrazia moderna: Max Weber e Robert Michels by Francesco Tuccari (Laterza, 1993)
 Intelectuales, masas y élites: una introducción a Mosca, Pareto y Michels by María de los Angeles Yannuzzi (UNR Editora, 1993).
 Robert Michels : die Herausbildung der modernen politischen Soziologie im Kontext von Herausforderung und Defizit der Arbeiterbewegung by Joachim Hetscher (1993)
 Robert Michels und das eiserne Gesetz der Oligarchie by Gustav Wagner in "Wer wählt, hat seine Stimme abgegeben" Graswurzel Revolution pp. 28
 Federico Trocini, Tra internazionalismo e nazionalismo. Robert Michels e i dilemmi del socialismo di fronte alla guerra e all’imperialismo (1900-1915), Aracne, Roma 2007.
 Federico Trocini, Irredentismo e patriottismo nella scelta italiana di Robert Michels (1895–1915): un’«arcana affinità elettiva», in «Annali dell’Istituto italo-germanico in Trento», XXXIII, 2007, pp. 449–490.
 Federico Trocini, Robert Michels: un marxista eterodosso al tempo della Seconda Internazionale (1900-1910), in POGGIO P. P. (a cura di), L’Altronovecento. Comunismo eretico e pensiero critico, 5 voll., Jaca Book, Milano 2010, vol. I (L’età del comunismo sovietico. Europa 1900–1945), pp. 305–319.
 Genett, Timm: Der Fremde im Kriege – Zur politischen Theorie und Biographie von Robert Michels 1876–1936. 2008.[1] 
 Genett, Timm (Hrsg.): Robert Michels: Soziale Bewegungen zwischen Dynamik und Erstarrung. Essays zur Arbeiter-, Frauen- und nationalen Bewegung. 2008. 
 Genett, Timm: "Antiquierter Klassiker? Zum ideengeschichtlichen Status von Robert Michels‘ „Soziologie des Parteiwesens“", in: Bluhm, Fischer, Lllanque (Hg.): Ideenpolitik, Berlin 2011, S.383–296.
 Genett, Timm: "Demokratische Sozialpädagogik in der Krise der Aufklärung – zur Ambivalenz eines Klassikers der Elitetheorie",  in: Bluhm, Krause (Hg.): Robert Michels‘ Soziologie des Parteiwesens, Wiesbaden 2012, S. 69–85.
 Genett, Timm: "Lettere di Ladislaus Gumplowicz a Roberto Michels (1902-1907)", in: Annali della Fondazione Luigi Einaudi, Vol. XXXI, Torino 1997, S. 417–473.
 Genett, Timm: "Lettere di Roberto Michels e di Julius Springer  (1913-1915)", in: Annali della Fondazione Luigi Einaudi, Vol. XXX, Torino 1996, S. 533–555.
 Robert Michels‘ Soziologie des Parteiwesens, hrsg v. Harald Bluhm und Skadi Krause, Wiesbaden 2012

External links

 Biography of Robert Michels at BookRags.com
 Political Parties, a PDF of Political Parties.
 Robert Michels – Oligarchy taken from Oscar Grusky and George A. Miller, The Sociology of Organizations: Basic Studies (Free Press, 1970, pp. 25–43). Reprints from Political Parties.
 Roberto Michels - Oligarchy comparison with Weber.
 Books and Articles on: Robert Michels  
 

1876 births
1936 deaths
Elite theory
German syndicalists
German socialists
German sociologists
Italian socialists
Writers from Cologne
People from the Rhine Province
Martin Luther University of Halle-Wittenberg alumni
Leipzig University alumni
Ludwig Maximilian University of Munich alumni
Academic staff of the University of Marburg
Academic staff of the University of Perugia
Italian fascists
German male writers
Union democracy
German emigrants to Italy
University of Paris alumni